Goulouré may refer to: 

Goulouré, Kokologho
Goulouré, Nanoro